Rick Anthony DeJesus (born September 20, 1983) is an American singer and songwriter, best known for being the founder and lead vocalist of the hard rock bands Adelitas Way and Sun Never Sets.

Musical career
In 2005, he was the singer for a band called DeJesus, which consisted of DeJesus on vocals, Chris Swabb and Randy Brown on lead and rhythm guitar, bassist Jason Schulze, and drummer Matt Gerbrbracht. This band headlined a concert at the House of Blues in Las Vegas with other local bands on December 8, 2005.

In 2006, the band DeJesus broke up and Rick DeJesus and some of friends from the band went on a detour to San Diego and decided to drive in a van to Tijuana, Mexico. DeJesus fell asleep and the van was pulled over by corrupt Mexican police officers who robbed them of their belongings. DeJesus managed to store some money in his sock. After being robbed, the members went to the nearest bar to drink to calm their nerves. They approached a bar named Adelita and entered, later discovering it was a brothel. DeJesus chatted with one of the girls, who he described to be "beautiful", and was saddened by the young women's life style. As a result, DeJesus formed a new band and named it Adelitas Way. In an interview with Brian Douglas, he said "She was never given a chance...Since then, I've learned to be thankful for everything." DeJesus wrote every released song independently, or with other writers and band members.

On March 17, 2017, since being the current lead vocalist in a hard rock band called Sun Never Sets with Los Angeles songwriter and musician Ryan Giles, the band had released a song called "Not Giving Up", which features Linkin Park drummer Rob Bourdon. On September 22, 2017, the band released another song called "What About the Day".

Discography
Adelitas Way discography

 Adelitas Way (2009)
 Home School Valedictorian (2011)
 Stuck (2014)
 Getaway (2016)
 Notorious (2017)
 Shine On (2020)

Sun Never Sets discography
 "Not Giving Up" (2017)
 "What About the Day" (2017)
 "Stay" (2019)

References

1983 births
Living people
American rock singers
21st-century American singers